Ivan Đorić (also transliterated Djorić; born 7 July 1995) is a Serbian footballer, who plays as a defensive midfielder.

Club career
Born in Niš, Đorić passed Red Star Belgrade youth academy, being also with BSK Borča for a period. In 2015, Đorić played with Ventspils along with other Serbian footballer Nikola Boranijašević. In early 2016, he was with Stade Nyonnais as a member of FC Sion. He was also loaned to Radnik Surdulica in summer same year. At the beginning of 2017, Đorić permanently moved to the club, and signed a three-year professional contract with Radnik Surdulica. In summer 2017, Đorić moved to OFK Bačka, making a debut for new club in a match against Vojvodina, under coach Dragan Ivanović.

Career statistics

References

External links
 
 
 
 

1995 births
Living people
Sportspeople from Niš
Serbian footballers
Association football midfielders
FK Ventspils players
FC Sion players
FC Stade Nyonnais players
FK Radnik Surdulica players
OFK Bačka players
FK Napredak Kruševac players
FK Voždovac players
FK Iskra Danilovgrad players
Mosta F.C. players
Serbian expatriate footballers
Expatriate footballers in Latvia
Serbian expatriate sportspeople in Latvia
Expatriate footballers in Switzerland
Serbian expatriate sportspeople in Switzerland
Expatriate footballers in Montenegro
Serbian expatriate sportspeople in Montenegro
Expatriate footballers in Malta
Serbian expatriate sportspeople in Malta
Latvian Higher League players
Serbian SuperLiga players
Montenegrin First League players
Maltese Premier League players